Serena Mackesy (pen name, Alex Marwood; born c. 1960s) is a British novelist and journalist who lives in London.

Life and education
Serena Mackesy is the daughter of the Scots-born Oxford military historian Piers Mackesy. She is also the granddaughter on her mother's side of the novelist Margaret Kennedy and on her father's side of Leonora Mackesy (born 1902), who wrote Harlequin romances as Leonora Starr and Dorothy Rivers. She grew up on the Oxfordshire/Gloucestershire borders and went to school in Oxford, where she gained a University of London degree in English literature from Manchester College, Oxford.

Mackesy worked variously in offices, as an English teacher and on door-to-door sales before, as she told an interviewer in 2000: "I arrived at The Independent as a temp to cover for the secretary on the TV listings page... for a couple of weeks, realised I'd found somewhere I enjoyed and somehow never left.... I think the first writing I did was little potted movie previews on the weekend TV spread. The first thing anyone seemed to actually notice was a small daily bar review I used to write when the paper had a London supplement." By 1997 she was a regular columnist.

As a child, Serena Mackesy was a keen rider. She has described Malta as her favourite place in the world.

Novels
Mackesy established her reputation with the novel The Temp (1999). This went into the Sunday Times Top Ten on publication. Since then, she has published Virtue (2000), Simply Heaven (2002), and Hold My Hand (2008).

In 2012, she adopted the pseudonym "Alex Marwood" with the publication of the psychological thriller The Wicked Girls. This became a word-of-mouth bestseller in the UK, and was translated into 17 languages. It was included in Stephen King's Entertainment Weekly list of "The Ten Best Books I read this year" in 2013 and was shortlisted for an ITW award in the same year. The book won the Edgar Allan Poe Award (best paperback original) in 2014 and is also shortlisted for the Macavity Awards and Anthony Awards in the United States. A follow-up, The Killer Next Door, was published in 2014 followed, in 2016, by The Darkest Secret.

Work of Mackesy's has been translated into 19 languages. Writers she admires include Kurt Vonnegut, C. S. Lewis (Narnia series), John Donne and the "other" Elizabeth Taylor (Angel).

Awards and recognition
 2013, shortlisted, ITW award
 2014, winner, Edgar Allan Poe Award
 shortlisted, Macavity Awards 
 shortlisted, Anthony Awards

References

1960s births
Living people
21st-century English novelists
People from Oxfordshire
English journalists
21st-century English women writers
Writers from London
English women novelists
English women non-fiction writers
21st-century pseudonymous writers
Pseudonymous women writers